Mayo Goi is a ward in Jalingo Local Government Area of Taraba state, Nigeria.

References 

Local Government Areas in Taraba State